Mohammadabad (also Romanized as Moḩammadābād) is a village in Miandorud-e Bozorg Rural District, in the Central District of Miandorud County, Mazandaran Province, Iran. At the 2006 census, its population was 272, in 71 families.

References 

Populated places in Miandorud County